Lake Xynias or Xyniada was a lake in Central Greece.

The lake lay in a caldera of Mount Othrys, and measured approximately 5 km × 7 km, with a depth of 5 m. It was named after the nearby city of Xyniae. In the Middle Ages, it received the Slavic name Ezeros, after which the city was also renamed.

The lake was drained in 1936–42 to create arable farmland.

References

Former lakes of Europe
Landforms of Phthiotis
Lakes of Greece